Sunnyvale railway station is located on the Western Line of the Auckland railway network.

The station was opened on 28 February 1924.

In 2006–2007, the station was closed over summer to be upgraded, and lengthened for 6-car trains.

Sunnyvale railway station was seen during the fourth episode of Outrageous Fortune's fifth season.

See also 
 List of Auckland railway stations

References 

Rail transport in Auckland
Railway stations in New Zealand
Railway stations opened in 1924
Henderson-Massey Local Board Area
Buildings and structures in Auckland
West Auckland, New Zealand